Yeni Mil is a village and municipality in the Beylagan Rayon of Azerbaijan. It has a population of 2,023.

References

Populated places in Beylagan District